The Ness County Bank, located at Main St. and Pennsylvania Ave. in Ness City, Kansas, was built during 1888–1890.  It was listed on the National Register of Historic Places in 1972.

It is a three-story stone building.  It has been locally known as the "Skyscraper of the Plains" and has been asserted to be the most elegant building of West Central Kansas.  Its architecture has aspects of Romanesque Revival style.

References

Bank buildings on the National Register of Historic Places in Kansas
Romanesque Revival architecture in Kansas
Commercial buildings completed in 1890
Ness County, Kansas